Escape from Mr. Lemoncello's Library is a children's novel by author Chris Grabenstein. It was on the New York Times bestseller list  for Middle Grade novels for 111 weeks between 2013 and 2016, peaking at #8 in hardback and #2 in paperback.

Grabenstein has stated that the book contains a secret puzzle that readers can decode. To solve it, he offers some advice given by Mr. Lemoncello in the book: "Forget the Industrial Revolution, my first idea might be your best solution."

Plot

Twelve-year-old Kyle Keeley loves games of all kinds, especially the board games and video games created by beloved game maker, Luigi Lemoncello. The morning after getting grounded for breaking a window while playing one of Lemoncello's games, Kyle's friend Akimi Hughes tells him of an essay for a school contest; the winners will be the first to visit the new, grand library in Kyle's town of Alexandriaville, Ohio. Initially, Kyle wasn't interested in books, but when he realizes the new library will offer games and computers, he quickly makes a very brief attempt.

At school, Kyle discovers that Mr. Lemoncello designed and funded the new library, and that he plans to judge the essay contest. Mr. Lemoncello credits much of his success to the help of Alexandriaville's old public library in his childhood. Regretful that he missed out on a great opportunity, Kyle tries to hand in a much stronger essay late, but his teacher refuses to accept it. Undeterred, Kyle finds an email address for Mr. Lemoncello and sends the essay directly to him. When Mr. Lemoncello arrives at Kyle's school to announce the essay contest winners, Dr. Yanina Zinchenko, world-famous librarian, explains that they will experience the grand new library in an overnight visit. Then Mr. Lemoncello walks onto the stage and announces the winners: Kyle, Akimi, helpful Miguel Fernandez, nerd Andrew Peckleman, Bridgette Wadge, bookworm Sierra Russell, Yasmeen Smith-Snyder, Sean Keegan, popular girl Haley Daley, Rose Vermette, over-eager Kayla Corson and bully Charles Chiltington. 

That night, the children enter the library. They play a trivia game with the prize of sleeping in the library's opulent bedroom suite, which Charles wins, and they compete to find dessert for the prize of early entry to the Electronic Learning Center. Kyle and Akimi pair up to win that. Other activities that night include watching an IMAX movie and seeing animatronic presidential debate.

The next morning, Mr. Lemoncello announces a new game: the first to escape the library within twenty-four hours will win the chance to appear in Lemoncello game commercials and earn money as the company spokesperson. Sean, Kayla, and Rose choose not to stay, and Bridgette and Yasmeen are eliminated early, Kyle, Akimi and Sierra form a team. Meanwhile, Charles focuses on the fake book covers in the "Staff Picks" display case in the library entryway and soon begins to find rebus clues in the hard copies of those titles. Kyle guesses that the different books pictured on the backs of their new library cards are a clue; his team pursues those. Soon Miguel joins Kyle's team, and Charles forces Haley and Andrew into joining forces with him.

By late that night, despite Charles's insistence that he will win, he is concerned that Kyle's team is doing well. So, he convinces Andrew to steal Sierra's library card to gain access to the private meeting room where Team Kyle's collected clues and hints are displayed. Andrew is caught in the morning and ejected from the game. Haley decides to change sides. After several more games, Charles attempts to strongarm the last clue from Kyle in a physical confrontation. Charles is caught and removed from the game. Kyle and his friends decipher the last of the clues and escape the library just in time..

Awards
Escape from Mr. Lemoncello's Library was a New York Times bestseller for Children's Middle Grade and received positive reviews. Giving it a starred review, Kirkus Reviews praised the book as a "solid, tightly plotted read" full of puzzles and puns. Publishers Weekly called it "that perfect book that isn’t girly or boyish, but is just a good book for any middle-grade reader." Reviewers (including author James Patterson, a frequent collaborator of Grabenstein's) also compared the book favorably to Roald Dahl's Charlie and the Chocolate Factory.

The novel was also the 2013 winner of the Agatha Award for Best Children's/Young Adult Novel. This was the fourth time that Grabenstein won this award, the first for his novel The Crossroads.

It has also won several Children's Choice State Book Awards:

 Arizona, Grand Canyon Reader Award;
 Delaware, Blue Hen Book Award;
 Florida, Sunshine State Young Readers Award;
 Indiana, Young Hoosier Book Award, Intermediate;
 Kansas, William Allen White Children's Book Award;
 Maine, Student Book Award;
 Maryland, Black-Eyed Susan Book Award;
 Minnesota, Maud Hart Lovelace Award;
 Mississippi, Magnolia Award;
 Missouri, Mark Twain Readers Award;
 Nebraska, The Golden Sower Award;
 New Hampshire, Great Stone Face Book Award;
 New Jersey, Garden State Book Award;
 North Dakota, Flicker Tale Children's Book Award;
 Ohio, Buckeye Children's and Teen Book Award;
 Oregon, Reader's Choice Award;
 Pacific Northwest Library Association, Young Reader's Choice Award;
 Rhode Island, Rhode Island Children's Book Award;
 Tennessee, Volunteer State Book Award;
 Vermont, Dorothy Canfield Fisher Book Award;
 Virginia, Virginia Reader's Choice Award;

In 2016, Escape from Mr. Lemoncello's Library was awarded the Mark Twain Readers Award by the Missouri Association of School Librarians.

Sequels
A sequel titled Mr. Lemoncello's Library Olympics was released on January 6, 2016. There is also a third book, Mr. Lemoncello's Great Library Race, which was released in October 2017. The fourth book is entitled Mr. Lemoncello's All-Star Breakout Game, which was released in May 2019. The fifth sequel, Mr. Lemoncello and the Titanium Ticket, was released on August 25, 2020.

Characters
Kyle Keeley - a huge fan of Mr. Lemoncello and Lemoncello Games who doesn't read a lot of books, but learns to keep a must-read list from Sierra Russell. (Captain of Team Kyle.)

Charles Chiltington - a rather rude boy who'll do anything to win, even if it means sabotaging the rules or his fellow middle-schoolers. (Captain of Team Charles.)

Akimi Hughes - Kyle's best friend who's one of the dozens of people that are super excited about the new secretive library. (Team Kyle.)

Miguel Fernandez - the intelligent and enthusiastic president of a book club at school and another one of Kyle's friends. (Solo, then Team Kyle.)

Andrew Peckleman - Miguel's friend-turned-enemy and an easily tempered book-lover who knows his way around the Dewey Decimal System. (Solo, then Team Charles.)

Haley Daley - a sometimes snobby spokesmodel, but is soft deep down in her heart and is competing in the competition to aid her financially struggling family. (Solo, then Team Charles, then Team Kyle.)

Sierra Russell - a quiet and shy bookworm whose parents are divorced, but learns to loosen up during the competition. (Team Kyle.)

Mr. Luigi L. Lemoncello - the eccentric and humorous creator of Lemoncello Games and the Lemoncello Library dropping scripted clues throughout the escape game. (Creator)

Dr. Yanina Zinchenko - the world-famous head librarian of the Lemoncello Library who is the only one that knows the way out of the library.

Mrs. Gail Tobin - Mr. Lemoncello's former librarian and the new holographic assistant of the library. (Deceased; in holographic form)

Adaptation

Escape from Mr. Lemoncello's Library was optioned by Nickelodeon as a movie, and filming was done in Vancouver BC, Canada.

The film was directed by Scott McAboy Produced by Amy Sydorick and stars Casey Simpson as Kyle Keeley, Breanna Yde as Akimi, Klarke Pipkin as Sierra, A.J. Louis Rivera Jr. as Andrew Peckleman, Ty Nicolas Consiglio as Charles Chiltington, Russell Roberts as Mr. Lemoncello, Kari Wahlgren as the voice of Charlotte from Charlotte's Web, and Dana Snyder as the voice of the Troll from Three Billy Goats Gruff.

The movie was released on October 9, 2017.

References

External links
 Pacific Bay Entertainment website
 
 Entertainment Weekly - Escape From Mr. Lemoncello's Library
 Kidscreen - Escape From Mr. Lemoncello's Library
 Business Wire - Escape From Mr. Lemoncello's Library
 Deadline - Escape From Mr. Lemoncello's Library
 Publishers Weekly - Escape From Mr. Lemoncello's Library
 Extra TV - Escape From Mr. Lemoncello's Library
 World Screen - Escape From Mr. Lemoncello's Library

2013 American novels
2013 children's books
American children's novels
American novels adapted into films
Agatha Award-winning works
American novels adapted into television shows
Novels set in Ohio
Mark Twain Awards
Random House books